Libow may refer to:

 Leslie S. Libow (1933–), US medical doctor
 Liepāja, Latvia; formerly known as Либау (Libau; Russian) and Libow (English)